The Schaus's crow (Euploea blossomae) is a species of nymphalid butterfly in the Danainae subfamily. Its common name is due to the author, William Schaus, who first described it. It is endemic to the Philippines.

References

Euploea
Lepidoptera of the Philippines
Butterflies described in 1929
Taxonomy articles created by Polbot